Mary Schneider AM, (born 25 October 1932) is an Australian singer, songwriter and performer, who is a master at the classic Swiss Alpine style. She is best known for yodelling the works of various standards by many a classic composer. Her repertoire has covered everything from yodelling of classical music pieces to marches and European folk music tunes and big band.

Her daughter, is the ARIA Award winning singer songwriter Melinda Schneider, is also an Australian country music entertainer and performer.

Biography

Schneider started her been performing career in 1945, when with her sister Rita Schneider, they formed the duo The Schneider Sisters  who in 2002 were inducted into the Australian Roll of Renown.

She has appeared on numerous TV shows including the Don and Mike Show, The Howard Stern Show and National Public Radio in the US, Spicks and Specks and Enough Rope on ABC TV and Eurotrash in the UK. Schneider was recognised in the Queens Birthday Honours in 2012.

Discography

Albums

Awards and honours

Australian Roll of Renown
The Australian Roll of Renown honours Australian and New Zealander musicians who have shaped the music industry by making a significant and lasting contribution to Country Music. It was inaugurated in 1976 and the inductee is announced at the Country Music Awards of Australia in Tamworth in January.

|-
| 2002
| The Schneider Sisters (Mary and Rita Schneider)
| Australian Roll of Renown
|

Mo Awards
The Australian Entertainment Mo Awards (commonly known informally as the Mo Awards), were annual Australian entertainment industry awards. They recognise achievements in live entertainment in Australia from 1975 to 2016. Mary Schneider won five awards in that time.
 (wins only)
|-
| 1983
| Mary Schneider
| Vocal / Instrumental Act of the Year
| 
|-
| 1984
| Mary Schneider
| Vocal / Instrumental Act of the Year
| 
|-
| 1985
| Mary Schneider
| Vocal / Instrumental Act of the Year
| 
|-
| 1986
| Mary Schneider
| Vocal / Instrumental Act of the Year
| 
|-
| 1987
| Mary Schneider
| Vocal / Instrumental Act of the Year
| 
|-

Tamworth Songwriters Awards
The Tamworth Songwriters Association (TSA) is an annual songwriting contest for original country songs, awarded in January at the Tamworth Country Music Festival. They commenced in 1986. Mary Schneider has won two awards.
 (wins only)
|-
| 1999
| "The Video Song" by Rita and Mary Schneider and Jim Haynes
| Comedy/ Novelty Song of the Year
| 
|-
| 2009
| The Schnieder Sisters
| Songmaker Award
|

References

External links
Home page

Australian women singers
Living people
Yodelers
Australian people of German descent
1932 births